Barenton is a commune in the Manche department in the Normandy region in northwestern France.

See also
Communes of the Manche department
Parc naturel régional Normandie-Maine

References

External links

Official site

Communes of Manche